Fatehullah Khan is a Pakistani politician who is member of the Gilgit Baltistan Assembly.

Political career
Khan contested 2020 Gilgit-Baltistan Assembly election on 15 November 2020 from constituency GBA-2 (Gilgit-II) on the ticket of Pakistan Tehreek-e-Insaf. He won the election by the margin of 2 votes over the runner up Jamil Ahmed of Pakistan Peoples Party. He garnered 6,696 votes while Ahmed received 6,694 votes. A recount was conducted, after which his victory margin increased to 96 votes.

References

Living people
Gilgit-Baltistan MLAs 2020–2025
Politicians from Gilgit-Baltistan
Year of birth missing (living people)